This is a list of countries by gross national income per capita in 2020 at nominal values, according to the Atlas method, an indicator of income developed by the World Bank.

Methodology 
The GNI per capita is the dollar value of a country's final income in a year, divided by its population. It should be reflecting the average before tax income of a country's citizens.

Knowing a country's GNI per capita is a good first step toward understanding the country's economic strengths and needs, as well as the general standard of living enjoyed by the average citizen. A country's GNI per capita tends to be closely linked with other indicators that measure the social, economic, and environmental well-being of the country and its people. 
All data is in U.S. dollars. Rankings shown are those given by the World Bank. Non-sovereign entities or other special groupings are marked in italics.

List of countries and dependencies

High-income group

Upper-middle-income group

Lower-middle-income group

Low-income group

No data

See also
World Bank high-income economy
List of countries by GNI (PPP) per capita
List of sovereign states in Europe by GNI (nominal) per capita
List of countries by wealth per adult

Notes and references

External links
The Atlas Method, by the World Bank

.Gni (Nominal) (Atlas Method)